The 1986 Queensland state election was held on 1 November 1986.

By-elections
 On 19 May 1984, Henry Palaszczuk (Labor) was elected to succeed Kevin Hooper (Labor), who had died on 9 March 1984, as the member for Archerfield.
 On 4 August 1984, Terry Gygar (Liberal) was elected to succeed Dr Denis Murphy, who had died on 21 June 1984, as the member for Stafford.
 On 16 February 1985, Paul Braddy (Labor) was elected to succeed Keith Wright (Labor), who had resigned on 5 November 1984, as the member for Rockhampton.
 On 2 November 1985, Paul Clauson (National) was elected to succeed John Goleby (National), who had died on 10 September 1985, as the member for Redlands.

Retiring Members

Labor
 Jim Fouras MLA (South Brisbane)

National
 Brian Cahill MLA (Aspley)
 Bill Kaus MLA (Mansfield)
 Neil Turner MLA (Warrego)
 John Warner MLA (Toowoomba South)
 Claude Wharton MLA (Burnett)

Independent
 Lindsay Hartwig MLA (Callide)
 Col Miller MLA (Ithaca)

Candidates
Sitting members at the time of the election are shown in bold text.

See also
 1986 Queensland state election
 Members of the Queensland Legislative Assembly, 1983–1986
 Members of the Queensland Legislative Assembly, 1986–1989
 List of political parties in Australia

References
 

Candidates for Queensland state elections